Ayódar is a municipality in the comarca of Alto Mijares, Castellón, Valencia, Spain.

Official web page = http://www.ayodar.es

Municipalities in the Province of Castellón
Alto Mijares